Miss South Africa 2010 was held on 12 December 2010 in Sun City, South Africa. The winner will represent South Africa at Miss Universe 2011 and Miss World 2011. 12 contestants competed for the crown. Bokang Montjane was crowned Miss South Africa 2010 by the outgoing title holder Nicole Flint from Pretoria.

Winner and runners-up
Color keys

Top 12

Crossovers 
Contestants who previously competed or will be competing at international beauty pageants: 

Miss World
2011:  Gauteng – Bokang Montjane (Top 7)
 (London)

Miss Universe
2011:  Gauteng – Bokang Montjane (Unplaced)
 (São Paulo)

Miss Earth
2007:  Gauteng – Bokang Montjane (Top 16)
 (Quezon City)
2009:  KwaZulu-Natal – Chanel Grantham (Top 16)
 (Boracay)

Miss International
2009:  Gauteng – Bokang Montjane (Unplaced)
 (Chengdu)
2011:  Gauteng – Natasha Kashimoto (Unplaced)
 (Chengdu)

Miss Supranational
2011:  Western Cape – Dhesha Jeram (Top 20)
 (Plock)

References

External links

2010
2010 beauty pageants
2010 in South Africa
December 2010 events in South Africa